The Rana palaces of Nepal were built by the Rana dynasty rulers of Nepal as both private and government buildings. The Rana rule lasted for 104 years, and during that time a number of grand royal residences were built, especially by the Prime Minister, his immediate family, and other high-ranking dignitaries.

The grand palaces of Rana were called white elephants and stood at the center of vast expanses of landscaped grounds, which Rana rulers used to show their supremacy over the common people, and to please their British friends and fellow Ranas. After the overthrow of the Rana Dynasty, some palaces were converted into government buildings. Others were demolished by their owners and rebuilt into libraries, museums, hotels, and heritage complexes. Most palaces still in private ownership have been destroyed or lie in ruins. Most government-owned palaces have been maintained and restored.

Basic information
Most of the Rana palaces are white plastered, have been built in Neoclassical or Baroque European architectural style, and are made up of four wings with arresting French windows, Grecian columns, and a large courtyard in the middle for religious and ceremonial purposes. The internal beams and columns of these palace are made of Salla Pinus roxburghii wood. Traditional mortar and white plaster, along with bricks, were used in construction. Black lentil paste, molasses, brick dust, mustard meal, and limestone powder were used in the cementing and plastering mixture. Lime-plaster (Bajra), a mixture of molasses, black pulse, jute, brick dust and lime, was the main ingredient for plaster as it had been for centuries in Nepal, primarily as it had good resistance against humidity. The floors were constructed using battens, rectangular in shape, above which planks were laid. These in turn supported the final floor, on which square-shaped slates were laid. Foreign-trained Newar architects designed most of the palaces.

Palaces

Earthquake of 2015
The earthquake of 2015 resulted in the destruction of many remaining palaces, particularly those built of mud-mortar brick and lime plaster.

See also
Daudaha system
Singha Durbar
Rani Mahal

References

 
 
Lists of tourist attractions in Nepal